Fahad Ebrahim Al Ansari (born 25 February 1987) is a former Kuwaiti footballer who plays as a midfielder for Al Qadsia and the Kuwait national team.

Trivia
He won his 100th cap in June 2021.

International goals
Scores and results list Kuwait's goal tally first.

Honours

Al-Qadsia

Kuwaiti Premier League (5) : 2009–10, 2010–11, 2011–12, 2013–14, 2015–16
Kuwait Emir Cup (4) : 2009–10, 2011–12, 2012–13, 2014–15
Kuwait Crown Prince Cup (2) : 2013, 2014
Kuwait Super Cup (3) : 2011, 2013, 2014
AFC Cup : 2014

Al-Ittihad
 Crown Prince Cup: 2016–17
 King Cup: 2018

References

1987 births
Living people
Kuwaiti footballers
Kuwaiti expatriate footballers
Kuwait international footballers
2011 AFC Asian Cup players
2015 AFC Asian Cup players
Sportspeople from Kuwait City
Qadsia SC players
Ittihad FC players
Al-Faisaly FC players
Al-Wakrah SC players
Kuwait Premier League players
Saudi Professional League players
Qatar Stars League players
Association football midfielders
AFC Cup winning players
Expatriate footballers in Saudi Arabia
Expatriate footballers in Qatar
Kuwaiti expatriate sportspeople in Saudi Arabia
Kuwaiti expatriate sportspeople in Qatar
FIFA Century Club